Paryse Martin is an American-born Canadian artist. She works in multiple disciplines, including painting, sculpture, illustration and animation.

Life and work

Paryse Martin was born in Caribou, Maine in the United States. In 1986, she completed her bachelor's degree in fine art from Université Laval, followed by her Master's of Fine Arts in 1994, again at Laval. Martin became a professor of fine art at Université Laval in 2000, where she continues to work today. In 2007, she completed PhD in art at the Université du Québec à Montréal.

Notable collections
L'Univers chiffonné, 2005, Musée national des beaux-arts du Québec
Cultiver L'Imaginaire, 2007, City of Montreal

Further reading
Gagnon, Claude-Maurice. "Paryse Martin : Le mur de la démesure / Paryse Martin, Petits effleurements pour un gourmand illicite, Galerie Simon Blais, Montréal. Du 2 décembre 1992 au 9 janvier 1993." ETC, number 22, may–august 1993, p. 48–49.

References

External links

Living people
People from Caribou, Maine
Université Laval alumni
Academic staff of Université Laval
Université du Québec à Montréal alumni
21st-century Canadian painters
1959 births
21st-century Canadian sculptors
21st-century Canadian women artists
Canadian women painters
Canadian women sculptors
Artists from Quebec